Grand Duke Nicholas Constantinovich of Russia (14 February 1850 – 26 January 1918) was the first-born son of Grand Duke Konstantin Nikolayevich and Grand Duchess Alexandra Iosifovna of Russia and a grandson of Nicholas I of Russia.

Early life
Born in St Petersburg in the middle of the nineteenth century into the House of Romanov, he had a very privileged childhood. Most royal children were brought up by nannies and servants so by the time Nikolai had grown up he lived a very independent life having become a gifted military officer and an incorrigible womanizer. He had an affair with a notorious American woman Fanny Lear. In a scandal related to this affair, he stole three valuable diamonds from the revetment of one of the most valuable family icons. He was declared insane and he was banished to Tashkent.

Later life
He lived for many years under constant supervision in the area around Tashkent in the southeastern Russian Empire (now Uzbekistan) and made a great contribution to the city by using his personal fortune to help improve the local area. In 1890 he ordered the building of his own palace in Tashkent to house and show his large and very valuable collection of works of art and the collection is now the center of the state Museum of Arts of Uzbekistan. He was also famous in Tashkent as a competent engineer and irrigator, constructing two large canals, the Bukhar-aryk (which was poorly aligned and soon silted up) and the much more successful Khiva-Aryk, later extended to form the Emperor Nicholas I Canal, irrigating 12,000 desyatinas, 33,000 acres (134 km2) of land in the Hungry Steppe between Djizak and Tashkent. Most of this was then settled with Slavic peasant colonisers.

Nikolai had a number of children by different women. One of his grandchildren, Natalia Androsova, died in Moscow in 1999.

Death
Nikolai died of pneumonia on 26 January 1918. He was buried in St. George's Cathedral (later demolished by the Soviet regime).

Family
Nikolai married Nadezhda (variantly spelled Nadejda) Alexandrovna von Dreyer (1861–1929), daughter of Orenburg police chief Alexander Gustavovich von Dreyer and Sophia Ivanovna Opanovskaya, in 1882. Two children were born from this marriage:
 Artemi Nikolayevich Prince Iskander (or Prince Romanovsky-Iskander) (1883–1919), killed in the Russian Civil War
  (15 November 1887 N.S. – 26 January 1957), married Olga Iosifovna Rogovskaya / Rogowska (1893–1962) on 5 May 1912. The couple had two children. Alexander and Olga were later divorced, and Alexander married Natalya Khanykova (30 December 1893 – 20 April 1982) in 1930. No children resulted from the latter marriage.
 Prince Kirill Romanovsky-Iskander, adopted name (via stepfather, Nicholas Androsov) Kirill Nikolaevich Androsov (5 December 1914 – 1992)
 Natalya Alexandrovna Princess Romanovskaya-Iskander, adopted name Natalya Nikolaevna Androsova (2 February 1917 – 1999)

Among his illegitimate children were the following:

With Alexandra Abasa (1855–4 Nov 1894):
 Nicholas Nikolayevich Wolinsky (11 December 1875, Moscow – 30 December 1913, Rome)
 Olga Nikolayevna Wolinskaya (May 1877, Odessa – 9 October 1910, Leipzig), wife of Ludwig Adolf von Burgund, Graf (Count) von Burgund (1865-1908), official of Kaiserliche Marine

With unknown mistresses:
 Stanislav (d. 1919)
 Nicholas (d. 1922)
 Daria (d. 1936)
 Tatiana (died ?)

Honours

Ancestry

References

External links
 Nikolai's Palace in Tashkent

1850 births
1918 deaths
Royalty from Saint Petersburg
People from Sankt-Peterburgsky Uyezd
House of Holstein-Gottorp-Romanov
Russian grand dukes
19th-century people from the Russian Empire
Grand Crosses of the Order of Saint Stephen of Hungary
Deaths from pneumonia in Uzbekistan